Atti is a village in Phillaur tehsil of Jalandhar District of Punjab State, India. It is located 2 km away from national highway 1 and 3.5 km away from postal head office Bara Pind. The village is 7 km away from Goraya,  12 km from Phillaur, 40 km from Jalandhar, and 121 km from state capital Chandigarh. The village is administrated by Sarpanch who is elected representative of village.

Caste 
The village has population of 1579 and in the village most of the villagers are from schedule caste (SC) which has constitutes 38.19% of total population of the village and it doesn't have any Schedule Tribe (ST) population.

Education 
Atti has a Co-educational Primary with Upper Primary and Secondary school (Shri Dashmesh Convent S. Atti School) which was founded in 1999.

Transport

Rail 
The nearest train station is situated in Goraya and Ludhiana Jn Railway Station is 25 km away from the village.

Air 
The nearest domestic airport is 43 km away in Ludhiana and the nearest international airport is 135 km away in Amritsar other nearest international airport is located in Chandigarh.

References 

Villages in Jalandhar district
Villages in Phillaur tehsil